Ravenea moorei is a species of palm tree. It is endemic to the Comoros. This species is critically endangered, with only two mature specimens last noted in 1993.

References

moorei
Endemic flora of the Comoros
Critically endangered flora of Africa
Taxonomy articles created by Polbot